Jesse Arthars (born 7 August 1998) is a New Zealand professional rugby league footballer who plays as a  or er for the Brisbane Broncos in the NRL.

He previously played for the Gold Coast Titans and spent time on loan from Brisbane at the New Zealand Warriors in the National Rugby League.

Background
Arthars was born in Auckland, New Zealand.

Playing career

Early career
From 2016 to 2017, Arthars played for the Melbourne Storm in the Holden Cup, scoring 22 tries and kicked 160 goals for 408 points in 44 games.

2018
In 2018, Arthars signed a one year deal to join South Sydney after leaving Melbourne Storm at the end of 2017.  On 5 October 2018, Arthars was released by Souths on compassionate grounds.  
Arthars spent the majority of 2018 playing with South Sydney's feeder club side North Sydney in the Intrust Super Premiership NSW making 6 appearances.

2019
On 9 May 2019, Arthars made his NRL debut for the Titans against the Cronulla-Sutherland Sharks.  In Round 22 of the 2019 NRL season, Arthars scored his first try for the Gold Coast in a 36-12 loss against Parramatta at Cbus Super Stadium.

On 29 October 2019, Arthars signed a two-year deal to join the Brisbane Broncos.

2020
Arthars made his club debut for the Broncos against the North Queensland Cowboys in a 28-21 victory. 
In the 2020 NRL season, Arthars played six games for Brisbane scoring 1 try as the club claimed the wooden spoon by finishing last on the table.

2021
Arthars was set to play his first game of the season in Round 6 against the Penrith Panthers before falling ill the day before the game and was replaced by Corey Oates.
In the 2021 NRL season, Arthars eventually played his first game of the season against the Gold Coast Titans scoring a try, as Brisbane achieved their greatest ever comeback coming back from 22-0 down, then winning 36-28. Arthars played 11 games scoring 5 tries and kicking 2 goals in the 2021 NRL season.

On 30 November, Brisbane agreed to loan Arthars to the New Zealand Warriors for the 2022 season before returning to the Brisbane club in 2023.

References

External links
Brisbane Broncos profile
Gold Coast Titans profile

1998 births
Living people
Brisbane Broncos players
New Zealand Warriors players
Burleigh Bears players
Gold Coast Titans players
New Zealand Māori rugby league players
New Zealand rugby league players
North Sydney Bears NSW Cup players
Rugby league centres
Rugby league fullbacks
Rugby league players from Auckland
Rugby league wingers